The 2018 Detroit Tigers season was the team's 118th season. It was the team's first year under a mostly new coaching staff led by new Manager Ron Gardenhire. It was the fourth consecutive season they missed the playoffs, finishing with the same record as the previous season, 64–98, but good for third place in the American League Central division.

It was the last season for television announcers Mario Impemba and Rod Allen, who had been together since 2003. Their contracts were not renewed due to an alleged physical altercation after the game on September 4.

Uniform changes
Starting this season, the Tigers changed the classic curved Old English D logo on their home uniforms to match that of the sharp cornered hat logo, which is now larger.

Roster moves

Coaching staff
On October 20, the Tigers announced Ron Gardenhire was named the successor to Brad Ausmus as the Tigers' manager, and signed to a three-year contract.
On November 2, the Tigers named Chris Bosio as pitching coach, Ramón Santiago as first-base coach, Phil Clark as assistant hitting coach, Rick Anderson as bullpen coach, Steve Liddle as bench coach, and Joe Vavra as quality control coach. Also on November 2, the Tigers announced Lloyd McClendon would return as hitting coach and Dave Clark would return as third-base coach.
On June 27, 2018, the Tigers terminated pitching coach Chris Bosio's contract due to "insensitive comments that violated Club policy and his Uniform Employee Contract." Bullpen coach Rick Anderson was then promoted to pitching coach.

Releases
On November 2, utility player Andrew Romine was claimed off waivers by the Seattle Mariners. Also on November 2, the Tigers announced they declined the team option on pitcher Aníbal Sánchez, making him a free agent. On March 16, Sánchez signed a minor-league contract with the Atlanta Braves.
On December 1, the Tigers announced they would not tender a contract to relief pitcher Bruce Rondón, making him a free agent. On February 1, Rondón signed a minor-league contract with the Chicago White Sox.
On December 28, free agent pitcher Kyle Ryan left the Tigers and signed a minor league contract with the Chicago Cubs.
On May 15, pitcher Chad Bell was claimed off waivers by the Atlanta Braves.
On May 22, the Tigers released pitcher Jairo Labourt. On May 29, Labourt signed a minor-league contract with the Chicago White Sox.

Signings
On November 25, the Tigers agreed to a one-year, $795,000 deal with relief pitcher Blaine Hardy, avoiding arbitration.
On December 5, the Tigers signed outfielder Leonys Martín to a one-year, $1.75 million contract.
On December 8, the Tigers signed pitcher Mike Fiers to a one-year, $6 million contract.
On December 14, the Tigers selected outfielder Víctor Reyes in the Rule 5 draft.
On January 9, the Tigers signed catcher Brayan Peña to a minor league contract. Peña retired as a player on June 18, 2018, and went on to manage the Tigers' rookie league team in the Gulf Coast League.
On January 11, the Tigers claimed pitcher Johnny Barbato off waivers from the Pittsburgh Pirates. Also on January 11, the Tigers signed catcher James McCann to a one-year, $2.375 million contract, avoiding arbitration.
On January 17, the Tigers avoided arbitration when they reached one-year deals with right fielder Nicholas Castellanos, shortstop José Iglesias, and pitchers Shane Greene and Alex Wilson.
On February 23, the Tigers signed pitcher Francisco Liriano to a one-year, $4 million contract.
On August 10, the Tigers signed relief pitcher Zach McAllister to a major league contract. He pitched in just three games for the Tigers before being designated for assignment and electing free agency on August 22.

Trades
On December 13, the Tigers traded second baseman Ian Kinsler to the Los Angeles Angels in exchange for 18-year old pitching prospect Wilkel Hernandez and minor league outfielder Troy Montgomery.
On July 31, the Tigers traded outfielder Leonys Martín and pitching prospect Kyle Dowdy to the Cleveland Indians in exchange for shortstop Willi Castro.
On August 6, the Tigers traded pitcher Mike Fiers to the Oakland Athletics in exchange for two players to be named later or cash considerations. On August 18, the Athletics sent pitcher Nolan Blackwood to the Tigers as one of the players to be named later. On September 19, 2018, the Athletics sent pitcher Logan Shore to the Tigers to complete the trade.

Number retirements
The Tigers retired Jack Morris' #47 on August 12 and Alan Trammell's #3 on August 26, both members of the 1984 World Champion team. They were inducted into the National Baseball Hall of Fame on the weekend of July 27–29.

Season standings

American League Central

American League Wild Card

Record against opponents

Season highlights

Team accomplishments
On April 8, the Tigers won a game with two or fewer hits for the first time since July 11, 2004 against the Minnesota Twins.
On May 28, the Tigers established a franchise record by hitting at least one double in 44 consecutive games, breaking the previous team record set in 1924. JaCoby Jones hit the record-breaking double in the fourth inning against the Los Angeles Angels. The streak was extended to 53 consecutive games before ending on June 6 against the Boston Red Sox. This was the third-longest streak in Major League history since at least 1908.
On July 15, the Tigers faced starter Justin Verlander for the first time since he was traded to the Houston Astros from the Tigers on August 31, 2017. Detroit won the game 6–3, while tagging Verlander for four home runs. It was only the third time in Verlander's career that he gave up four home runs in a game.

Individual accomplishments

Pitching
On April 21 against the Kansas City Royals, Mike Fiers became just the second Tigers player since 1908 to give up 10 or more hits in fewer than six innings, strike out nobody and earn a victory, and the first Tigers player to do since Dan Petry in 1984.
On April 22 against the Kansas City Royals, Francisco Liriano took a no-hitter into the sixth inning, before a home run by Whit Merrifield ruined the no-hit bid.
On May 20 against the Seattle Mariners, Francisco Liriano took a no-hitter into the seventh inning, before a one-out single by Mitch Haniger ruined the no-hit bid.
On August 3 against the Oakland Athletics, Blaine Hardy took a no-hitter into the seventh inning, before an infield single by Jed Lowrie ruined the no-hit bid.
On August 31 against the New York Yankees, Jordan Zimmermann took a no-hitter into the sixth inning, before a two-run home run by Brett Gardner ruined the no-hit bid.
On September 9 against the St. Louis Cardinals, Michael Fulmer took a perfect game into the sixth inning, before allowing a walk to Yairo Muñoz to start the inning.

Hitting
On April 25, Jeimer Candelario fell a triple shy of the cycle, hitting a single, double, and home run, to help the Tigers defeat the Pittsburgh Pirates, 13–10.
On August 13 against the Chicago White Sox, Nicholas Castellanos went 5-for-5 with 5 RBIs. He became the first Tigers player with five hits in a game since Ian Kinsler in 2015, and the first with 10 total bases in a game since Justin Upton in 2017.
On September 20 against the Kansas City Royals, Christin Stewart hit his first two major league home runs in his first two at-bats, and had six RBIs in the game. It was the first time a Tiger player hit his first two major league home runs in the same game since Brent Clevlen in 2006, the first time a Tiger rookie had a six-RBI game since Ryan Raburn had a seven-RBI game in 2007, and the first time since 1908 that a Tiger player had a six-RBI game within his first 11 career contests.

Defense
JaCoby Jones' Defensive Runs Saved rating of 24 (meaning 24 better than league average) was the best among all major league outfielders, and he finished second to Mookie Betts in Ultimate Zone Rating.

Game log

|- bgcolor="bbbbbb"
| — || March 29 || Pirates || colspan="9" | Postponed (inclement weather). Rescheduled to March 30.
|- bgcolor="ffbbbb"
| 1 || March 30 || Pirates || 10–13 (13) || Brault (1–0) || Wilson (0–1) || — || 42,516 || 0–1 || L1
|- bgcolor="bbbbbb"
| — || March 31 || Pirates || colspan="9" | Postponed (inclement weather). Rescheduled to April 1.
|- bgcolor="ffbbbb"
| 2 || April 1 || Pirates || 0–1 || Williams (1–0) || Fulmer (0–1) || Rivero (1) || 14,858 || 0–2 ||  L2
|- bgcolor="ffbbbb"
| 3 || April 1 || Pirates || 6–8 || Kuhl (1–0) || Farmer (0–1) || Rivero (2) || 18,438 || 0–3 || L3
|- bgcolor="bbffbb"
| 4 || April 2 || Royals || 6–1 || Liriano (1–0) || Hammel (0–1) || — || 15,476 || 1–3 || W1
|- bgcolor="ffbbbb"
| 5 || April 3 || Royals || 0–1 || Junis (1–0) || Boyd (0–1) || Herrera (1) || 15,083 || 1–4 || L1
|- bgcolor="bbbbbb"
| — || April 4 || Royals || colspan="9" | Postponed (inclement weather). Rescheduled to April 20.
|- bgcolor="bbffbb"
| 6 || April 5 || @ White Sox || 9–7 (10) || Jiménez (1–0) || Infante (0–1) || Greene (1) || 33,318 || 2–4 || W1
|- bgcolor="bbffbb"
| 7 || April 7 || @ White Sox || 6–1 || Fulmer (1–1) || Giolito (0–1) || — || 16,625 || 3–4 || W2
|- bgcolor="bbffbb"
| 8 || April 8 || @ White Sox || 1–0 || Fiers (1–0) || López (0–1) || Greene (2) || 11,131 || 4–4 || W3
|- bgcolor="ffbbbb"
| 9 || April 9 || @ Indians || 0–2 || Kluber (1–1) || Liriano (1–1) || Miller (1) || 9,843 || 4–5 || L1
|- bgcolor="ffbbbb"
| 10 || April 10 || @ Indians || 1–2 || Miller (1–0) || Wilson (0–2) || Allen (3) || 10,078 || 4–6 || L2
|- bgcolor="ffbbbb"
| 11 || April 11 || @ Indians || 1–5 || Carrasco (3–0) || Norris (0–1) || — || 10,872 || 4–7 || L3
|- bgcolor="ffbbbb"
| 12 || April 12 || @ Indians || 3–9 || Bauer (1–1) || Fulmer (1–2) || — || 12,901 || 4–8 || L4
|- bgcolor="ffbbbb"
| 13 || April 13 || Yankees || 6–8 || Montgomery (1–0) || Fiers (1–1) || Chapman (2) || 21,363 || 4–9 || L5
|- bgcolor="bbbbbb"
| — || April 14 || Yankees || colspan="9" | Postponed (inclement weather). Rescheduled to April 15.
|- bgcolor="bbbbbb"
| — || April 15 || Yankees || colspan="9" | Postponed (inclement weather). Rescheduled to June 4.
|- bgcolor="bbbbbb"
| — || April 15 || Yankees || colspan="9" | Postponed (inclement weather). Rescheduled to June 4.
|- bgcolor="bbffbb"
| 14 || April 17 || Orioles || 4–2 || Liriano (2–1) || Cashner (1–2) || Greene (3) || 15,530 || 5–9 || W1
|- bgcolor="bbffbb"
| 15 || April 18 || Orioles || 6–5 || Greene (1–0) || Araújo (1–2) || — || 15,178 || 6–9 || W2
|- bgcolor="bbffbb"
| 16 || April 19 || Orioles || 13–8 || Zimmermann (1–0) || Cobb (0–2) || — || 15,916 || 7–9 || W3
|- bgcolor="bbffbb"
| 17 || April 20 || Royals || 3–2 (10) || Jiménez (2–0) || Keller (0–1) || — || 15,406 || 8–9 || W4
|- bgcolor="ffbbbb"
| 18 || April 20 || Royals || 2–3 || Junis (3–1) || Greene (1–1) || Herrera (3) || 17,194 || 8–10 || L1
|- bgcolor="bbffbb"
| 19 || April 21 || Royals || 12–4 || Fiers (2–1) || Duffy (0–3)
|| Saupold (1) || 19,302 || 9–10 || W1
|- bgcolor="ffbbbb"
| 20 || April 22 || Royals || 5–8 || McCarthy (1–0) || VerHagen (0–1) || Herrera (4) || 19,034 || 9–11 || L1
|- bgcolor="bbbbbb"
| — || April 24 || @ Pirates || colspan="9" | Postponed (inclement weather). Rescheduled to April 25.
|- bgcolor="bbffbb"
| 21 || April 25 || @ Pirates || 13–10 || Stumpf (1–0) || Taillon (2–2) || Greene (4) || 9,396 || 10–11 || W1
|- bgcolor="ffbbbb"
| 22 || April 25 || @ Pirates || 3–8 || Kuhl (3–1) || Boyd (0–2) || — || 9,396 || 10–12 || L1
|- bgcolor="ffbbbb"
| 23 || April 26 || @ Pirates || 0–1 || Vázquez (1–0) || Wilson (0–3) || — || 12,049 || 10–13 || L2
|- bgcolor="ffbbbb"
| 24 || April 27 || @ Orioles || 0–6 || Tillman (1–4) || Fiers (2–2) || — || 14,223 || 10–14 || L3
|- bgcolor="bbffbb"
| 25 || April 28 || @ Orioles || 9–5 || Liriano (3–1) || Cashner (1–4) || — || 20,896 || 11–14 || W1
|- bgcolor="ffbbbb"
| 26 || April 29 || @ Orioles || 3–5 || Gausman (2–2) || Norris (0–2) || O'Day (2) || 28,089 || 11–15 || L1
|- bgcolor="ffbbbb"
| 27 || April 30 || Rays || 2–3 || Faria (2–1) || Greene (1–2) || Alvarado (1) || 19,398 || 11–16 || L2
|-

|- bgcolor="bbffbb"
| 28 || May 1 || Rays || 2–1 || Boyd (1–2) || Archer (2–2) || Greene (5) || 17,255 || 12–16 || W1
|- bgcolor="bbffbb"
| 29 || May 2 || Rays || 3–2 (12) || Saupold (1–0) || Andriese (0–1) || — || 20,866 || 13–16 || W2
|- bgcolor="ffbbbb"
| 30 || May 3 || @ Royals || 6–10 || McCarthy (3–0) || Bell (0–1) || — || 28,866 || 13–17 || L1
|- bgcolor="ffbbbb"
| 31 || May 4 || @ Royals || 2–4 || Boyer (1–0) || Stumpf (1–1) || Herrera (6) || 24,648 || 13–18 || L2
|- bgcolor="bbffbb"
| 32 || May 5 || @ Royals || 3–2 || Zimmermann (2–0) || Hammel (0–4) || Greene (6) || 20,708 || 14–18 || W1
|- bgcolor="ffbbbb" 
| 33 || May 6 || @ Royals || 2–4 || Junis (4–2) || Boyd (1–3) ||  Herrera (7) || 18,424 || 14–19 || L1
|- bgcolor="ffbbbb" 
| 34 || May 7 || @ Rangers || 6–7 || Leclerc (1–0) || Stumpf (1–2) || Kela (7) || 20,057 || 14–20 || L2
|- bgcolor="bbffbb"
| 35 || May 8 || @ Rangers || 7–4 || Fiers (3–2) || Minor (3–2) || Greene (7) || 18,634 || 15–20 || W1
|- bgcolor="ffbbbb" 
| 36 || May 9 || @ Rangers || 4–5 (10) || Kela (3–2) || Saupold (1–1) || — || 30,387 || 15–21 || L1
|- bgcolor="bbbbbb"
| — || May 11 || Mariners || colspan="9" | Postponed (inclement weather). Rescheduled to May 12.
|- bgcolor="bbffbb"
| 37 || May 12 || Mariners || 4–3 || Boyd (2–3) || Gonzales (3–3) || Greene (8) || 25,506 || 16–21 || W1
|- bgcolor="ffbbbb" 
| 38 || May 12 || Mariners || 5–9 || Hernández (5–3) || Fulmer (1–3) || — || 25,506 || 16–22 || L1
|- bgcolor="bbffbb" 
| 39 || May 13 || Mariners || 5–4 || Greene (2–2) || Nicasio (1–2) || — || 24,718 || 17–22 || W1
|- bgcolor="bbffbb" 
| 40 || May 14 || Indians || 6–3 || Fiers (4–2) || Carrasco (5–2) || — || 17,775 || 18–22 || W2
|- bgcolor="bbffbb" 
| 41 || May 15 || Indians || 9–8 || Coleman (1–0) || Miller (1–2) || Greene (9) || 20,997 || 19–22 || W3
|- bgcolor="ffbbbb" 
| 42 || May 16 || Indians || 0–6 || Bauer (3–3) || Carpenter (0–1) || — || 24,771 || 19–23 || L1
|- bgcolor="bbffbb"
| 43 || May 17 || @ Mariners || 3–2 || Saupold (2–1) || Vincent (1–1) || Greene (10) || 15,169 || 20–23 || W1
|- bgcolor="ffbbbb" 
| 44 || May 18 || @ Mariners || 4–5 || Altavilla (3–2) || Farmer (0–2) || Díaz (15) || 34,932 || 20–24 || L1
|- bgcolor="ffbbbb" 
| 45 || May 19 || @ Mariners || 2–7 || Paxton (3–1) || Fiers (4–3) || — || 35,739 || 20–25 || L2
|- bgcolor="ffbbbb" 
| 46 || May 20 || @ Mariners || 2–3 (11) || Vincent (2–1) || Farmer (0–3) || — || 34,252 || 20–26 || L3
|- bgcolor="ffbbbb" 
| 47 || May 21 || @ Twins || 2–4 || Berríos (5–4) || Stumpf (1–3) || Rodney (10) || 17,161 || 20–27 || L4
|- bgcolor="ffbbbb" 
| 48 || May 22 || @ Twins || 0–6 || Lynn (2–4) || Boyd (2–4) || — || 25,559 || 20–28 || L5
|- bgcolor="bbffbb"
| 49 || May 23 || @ Twins || 4–1 || Fulmer (2–3) || Gibson (1–3) || Greene (11) || 23,891 || 21–28 || W1
|- bgcolor="bbffbb"
| 50 || May 25 || White Sox || 5–4 || Farmer (1–3) || Rondón (2–3)  || Greene (12) || 24,648 || 22–28 || W2
|- bgcolor="ffbbbb" 
| 51 || May 26 || White Sox || 4–8 || Santiago (1–2) || Liriano (3–2) || — || 27,032 || 22–29 || L1
|- bgcolor="bbffbb"
| 52 || May 27 || White Sox || 3–2 || Hardy (1–0) || Shields (1–5) || Greene (13) || 23,419 || 23–29 || W1 
|- bgcolor="bbffbb"
| 53 || May 28 || Angels || 9–3 || Boyd (3–4) || Skaggs (3–4) || — || 20,857 || 24–29 || W2
|- bgcolor="ffbbbb" 
| 54 || May 29 || Angels || 2–9 || Tropeano (3–3) || Fulmer (2–4) || — || 17,397 || 24–30 || L1
|- bgcolor="bbffbb"
| 55 || May 30 || Angels || 6–1 || Coleman (2–0) || Bedrosian (1–1) || — || 19,494 || 25–30 || W1
|- bgcolor="bbffbb"
| 56 || May 31 || Angels || 6–2 || Saupold (3–1) || Heaney (2–4) || — || 24,696 || 26–30 || W2
|-

|- bgcolor="bbffbb"
| 57 || June 1 || Blue Jays || 5–2 || Hardy (2-0) || García (2-4) || Greene (14) || 22,192 || 27–30 || W3
|- bgcolor="bbffbb"
| 58 || June 2 || Blue Jays || 7–4 || Coleman (3–0) || Oh (1–1) || Jiménez (1) || 34,674 || 28–30 || W4
|- bgcolor="ffbbbb" 
| 59 || June 3 || Blue Jays || 4–8 || Sanchez (3–5) || Fulmer (2–5) || — || 24,658 || 28–31 || L1
|- bgcolor="ffbbbb" 
| 60 || June 4 || Yankees || 4–7 || Severino (9–1) || VerHagen (0–2) || Chapman (14) || 28,016 || 28–32 || L2
|- bgcolor="bbffbb"
| 61 || June 4 || Yankees || 4–2 || Fiers (5–3) || Germán (0–4) || Greene (15) || 24,165 || 29–32 || W1
|- bgcolor="ffbbbb" 
| 62 || June 5 || @ Red Sox || 0–6 || Wright (2–0) || Lewicki (0–1) || — || 34,762 || 29–33 || L1
|- bgcolor="ffbbbb" 
| 63 || June 6 || @ Red Sox || 1–7 || Rodríguez (7–1) || Hardy (2-1) || — || 35,182 || 29–34 || L2
|- bgcolor="bbffbb"
| 64 || June 7 || @ Red Sox || 7–2 || Boyd (4–4) || Beeks (0–1) || — || 36,556 || 30–34 || W1
|- bgcolor="ffbbbb" 
| 65 || June 8 || Indians || 1–4 || Bauer (5–4) || Greene (2–3) || Allen (12) || 21,766 || 30–35 || L1
|- bgcolor="bbffbb"
| 66 || June 9 || Indians || 4–2 (12) || Saupold (4–1) || Allen (2–3) || — || 27,038 || 31–35 || W1
|- bgcolor="ffbbbb" 
| 67 || June 10 || Indians || 2–9 || Kluber (10–2) || Lewicki (0–2) || — || 22,862 || 31–36 || L1
|- bgcolor="ffbbbb" 
| 68 || June 12 || Twins || 4–6 || Pressly (1–1) || Coleman (3–1) || Rodney (14) || 20,340 || 31–37 || L2
|- bgcolor="bbffbb"
| 69 || June 13 || Twins || 5–2 || Jiménez (3–0) || Reed (1–5) || Greene (16) || 19,206 || 32–37 || W1
|- bgcolor="bbffbb"
| 70 || June 14 || Twins || 3–1 || Fulmer (3–5) || Lynn (4–5) || Greene (17) || 27,573 || 33–37 || W2 
|- bgcolor="bbffbb"
| 71 || June 15 || @ White Sox || 4–3 || Farmer (2–3) || Minaya (0–1) || Greene (18) || 22,813 || 34–37 || W3
|- bgcolor="bbffbb"
| 72 || June 16 || @ White Sox || 7–5 || Farmer (3–3) || Fry (0–1) || Greene (19) || 23,195 || 35–37 || W4
|- bgcolor="bbffbb"
| 73 || June 17 || @ White Sox || 3–1 || Hardy (3-1) || Shields (2–8) || Jiménez (2) || 26,746 || 36–37 || W5
|- bgcolor="ffbbbb" 
| 74 || June 19 || @ Reds || 5–9 || Romano (4–7) || Boyd (4–5) || — || 31,085 || 36–38 || L1
|- bgcolor="ffbbbb" 
| 75 || June 20 || @ Reds || 3–5 || Mahle (6–6) || Fulmer (3–6) || Iglesias (11) || 19,177 || 36–39 || L2
|- bgcolor="ffbbbb" 
| 76 || June 22 || @ Indians || 0–10 || Bieber (2–0) || Fiers (5–4) || — || 30,926 || 36–40 || L3
|- bgcolor="ffbbbb" 
| 77 || June 23 || @ Indians || 1–4 || Bauer (7–5) || Liriano (3–3) || Allen (16) || 34,435 || 36–41 || L4
|- bgcolor="ffbbbb" 
| 78 || June 24 || @ Indians || 2–12 || Plutko (4–1) || Boyd (4–6) || — || 31,208 || 36–42 || L5
|- bgcolor="ffbbbb" 
| 79 || June 25 || Athletics || 4–5 || Trivino (6–1) || Greene  (2–4) || Treinen (18) || 19,127 || 36–43 || L6
|- bgcolor="ffbbbb" 
| 80 || June 26 || Athletics || 7–9 || Buchter (2–0) || Greene  (2–5) || Treinen (19) || 22,809 || 36–44 || L7
|- bgcolor="ffbbbb" 
| 81 || June 27 || Athletics || 0–3 || Bassitt (1–3) || Fiers (5–5) || Trivino (2) || 23,961 || 36–45 || L8
|- bgcolor="ffbbbb" 
| 82 || June 28 || Athletics || 2–4 || Manaea (8–6) || Fulmer (3–7) || Treinen (20) || 28,866 || 36–46 || L9
|- bgcolor="ffbbbb" 
| 83 || June 29 || @ Blue Jays || 2–3 || Stroman (1–5) || Liriano (3–4) || Clippard (5) || 24,068 || 36–47 || L10
|- bgcolor="ffbbbb"
| 84 || June 30 || @ Blue Jays || 3–4 || Oh (4–2) || Jiménez (3–1) || — || 27,066 || 36–48 || L11
|-

|- bgcolor="bbffbb"
| 85 || July 1 || @ Blue Jays || 9–1 || Zimmermann (3–0) || Happ (10–4) || — || 37,445 || 37–48 || W1
|- bgcolor="bbffbb"
| 86 || July 2 || @ Blue Jays || 3–2 (10) || Jiménez (4–1) || Oh (4–3) || Hardy (1) || 29,575 || 38–48 || W2
|- bgcolor="ffbbbb"
| 87 || July 3 || @ Cubs || 3–5 || Wilson (3–2) || Stumpf (1–4) || Strop (2) || 38,424 || 38–49 || L1
|- bgcolor="ffbbbb"
| 88 || July 4 || @ Cubs || 2–5 || Quintana (7–6) || Liriano (3–5) || Morrow (19)  || 40,510 || 38–50 || L2
|- bgcolor="ffbbbb"
| 89 || July 5 || Rangers || 5–7 || Gallardo (3–0) || Boyd (4–7) || Kela (21) || 21,248 || 38–51 || L3
|- bgcolor="bbffbb"
| 90 || July 6 || Rangers || 3–1 || Zimmermann (4–0) || Colón (5–6) || Jiménez (3) || 27,316 || 39–51 || W1
|- bgcolor="bbffbb" 
| 91 || July 7 || Rangers || 7–2 || Fiers (6–5) || Hamels (4–8) ||  — || 29,174 || 40–51 || W2
|- bgcolor="ffbbbb"
| 92 || July 8 || Rangers || 0–3 ||Bibens-Dirkx (2–2) || Fulmer (3–8) ||Kela (22) || 22,047 || 40–52 || L1
|- bgcolor="ffbbbb"
| 93 || July 9 || @ Rays || 9–10 (10) || Andriese (2–3) || Hardy (3–2) || — || 14,229 || 40–53 || L2
|- bgcolor="ffbbbb"
| 94 || July 10 || @ Rays || 2–5 || Alvarado (1–3) || Boyd (4–8) || Romo (10) || 13,478 || 40–54 || L3 
|- bgcolor="ffbbbb"
| 95 || July 11 || @ Rays || 2–4 || Yarbrough (8–4) || Zimmermann (4–1) || Romo (11) || 13,922 || 40–55 || L4
|- bgcolor="ffbbbb"
| 96 || July 13 || @ Astros || 0–3 || Keuchel (7–8) || Fiers (6–6) || Rondón (8) || 38,843 || 40–56 || L5
|- bgcolor="ffbbbb"
| 97 || July 14 || @ Astros || 1–9 || Cole (10–2) || Fulmer (3–9) || — || 40,405 || 40–57 || L6
|- bgcolor="bbffbb" 
| 98 || July 15 || @ Astros || 6–3 || VerHagen (1–2) || Verlander (9–5) || — || 39,455 || 41–57 || W1
|- style="text-align:center; background:#bbcaff;"
| colspan="10" | 2018 Major League Baseball All-Star Game
|- bgcolor="ffbbbb" 
| 99 || July 20 || Red Sox || 0–1 || Price (11–6) || Boyd (4–9) || Kimbrel (31) || 33,817 || 41–58 || L1
|- bgcolor="bbffbb" 
| 100 || July 21 || Red Sox || 5–0 || Fiers (7–6) || Johnson (1–3) || — || 31,682 || 42–58 || W1
|- bgcolor="ffbbbb" 
| 101 || July 22 || Red Sox || 1–9 || Sale (11–4) || Hardy (3–3) || — || 25,012 || 42–59 || L1
|- bgcolor="bbffbb" 
| 102 || July 23 || @ Royals || 5–4 || Wilson (1–3) || Maurer (0–4) || Greene (20) || 18,370 || 43–59 || W1
|- bgcolor="ffbbbb" 
| 103 || July 24 || @ Royals || 4–5 || Smith (1–1) || Zimmermann (4–2) || Peralta (5) || 29,957 || 43–60 || L1 
|- bgcolor="bbffbb" 
| 104 || July 25 || @ Royals || 8–4 || Boyd (5–9) || Duffy (6–9) || — || 17,382 || 44–60 || W1
|- bgcolor="ffbbbb" 
| 105 || July 27 || Indians || 3–8 || Allen (3–4) || Jiménez (4–2) || — || 26,962 || 44–61 || L1
|- bgcolor="bbffbb" 
| 106 || July 28 || Indians || 2–1 || Hardy (4–3) || Clevinger (7–7) || Greene (21) || 29,097 || 45–61 || W1
|- bgcolor="ffbbbb" 
| 107 || July 29 || Indians || 1–8 || Kluber (13–6) || Zimmermann (4–3) || — || 26,498 || 45–62 || L1
|- bgcolor="bbffbb" 
| 108 || July 31 || Reds || 2–1 || Boyd (6–9) || Bailey (1–8) || Greene (22) || 24,929 || 46–62 || W1
|-

|- bgcolor="bbffbb" 
| 109 || August 1 || Reds || 7–4 || VerHagen (2–2) || Romano (6–9) ||  Greene (23) || 24,952 || 47–62 || W2
|- bgcolor="ffbbbb"
| 110 || August 3 || @ Athletics || 0–1 (13) || Pagan (3–0) || Farmer (3–4) || — || 14,766 || 47–63 || L1
|- bgcolor="ffbbbb"
| 111 || August 4 || @ Athletics || 1–2 || Jackson (3–2) || Zimmermann (4–4) || Treinen (28) || 33,668 || 47–64 || L2
|- bgcolor="ffbbbb"
| 112 || August 5 || @ Athletics || 0–6 || Cahill (4–2) || Liriano (3–6) || — || 19,559 || 47–65 || L3
|- bgcolor="ffbbbb"
| 113 || August 6 || @ Angels || 2–6 || Tropeano (5–6) || Boyd (6–10) || — || 34,073 || 47–66 || L4
|- bgcolor="ffbbbb"
| 114 || August 7 || @ Angels || 5–11 || Heaney (7–7) || Turner (0–1) || — || 35,824 || 47–67 || L5
|- bgcolor="ffbbbb"
| 115 || August 8 || @ Angels || 0–6 || Barría (7–7) || Hardy (4–4) || — || 38,832 || 47–68 || L6
|- bgcolor="bbffbb" 
| 116 || August 10 || Twins || 5–3 || Zimmermann (5–4) || Santana (0–1) || Greene (24) || 24,849 || 48–68 || W1
|- bgcolor="ffbbbb"
| 117 || August 11 || Twins || 3–4 || Gibson (6–9) || Liriano (3–7) || Hildenberger (1) || 26,991 || 48–69 || L1
|- bgcolor="bbffbb" 
| 118 || August 12 || Twins || 4–2 || Boyd (7–10) || Stewart (0–1) || Greene (25) || 30,105 || 49–69 || W1
|- bgcolor="bbffbb" 
| 119 || August 13 || White Sox || 9–5 || Coleman (4–1) || Gómez (0–1) || — || 20,964 || 50–69 || W2
|- bgcolor="ffbbbb"
| 120 || August 14 || White Sox || 3–6 || Giolito (8–9) || Hardy (4–5) || Cedeño (1) || 20,661 || 50–70 || L1
|- bgcolor="ffbbbb"
| 121 || August 15 || White Sox || 5–6 || Rodón (4–3)  || Zimmermann (5–5) || Avilán (2) || 23,784  || 50–71 || L2 
|- bgcolor="ffbbbb"
| 122 || August 16 || @ Twins || 8–15 || May (1–0) || Liriano (3–8) || — || 25,108 || 50–72 || L3
|- bgcolor="ffbbbb"
| 123 || August 17 || @ Twins || 4–5 || Gibson (7–9) || Boyd (7–11) || Rogers (1) || 26,605 || 50–73 || L4
|- bgcolor="bbffbb" 
| 124 || August 18 || @ Twins || 7–5 || Carpenter (1–1) || Duffey (1–2) || Greene (26) || 31,904 || 51–73 || W1
|- bgcolor="ffbbbb"
| 125 || August 19 || @ Twins || 4–5 || Hildenberger (3–3) || Wilson (1–4) || — || 27,917 || 51–74 || L1 
|- bgcolor="bbffbb" 
| 126 || August 21 || Cubs || 2–1 || Zimmermann (6–5) || Hendricks (9–10) || Greene (27) || 26,638 || 52–74 || W1
|- bgcolor="ffbbbb"
| 127 || August 22 || Cubs || 2–8 || Lester (14–5) || Liriano (3–9) || — || 28,286 || 52–75 || L1 
|- bgcolor="bbffbb" 
| 128 || August 23 || White Sox || 7–2 || Boyd (8–11) || Shields (5–15) || — || 22,247 || 53–75 || W1 
|- bgcolor="ffbbbb"
| 129 || August 24 || White Sox || 3–6 || Vieira (1–0) || Jiménez (4–3) || — || 23,191 || 53–76 || L1
|- bgcolor="ffbbbb"
| 130 || August 25 || White Sox || 1–6 || Giolito (10–9) || Carpenter (1–2) || — || 26,183 || 53–77 || L2
|- bgcolor="ffbbbb"
| 131 || August 26 || White Sox || 2–7 || Kopech (1–0) || Zimmermann (6–6) || Fry (3) || 34,036 || 53–78 || L3
|- bgcolor="ffbbbb"
| 132 || August 28 || @ Royals || 2–6 || Junis (7–12) || Boyd (8–12) || — || 16,888 || 53–79 || L4
|- bgcolor="ffbbbb"
| 133 || August 29 || @ Royals || 2–9 || Duffy (8–11) || Fulmer (3–10) || — || 17,091 || 53–80 || L5
|- bgcolor="bbffbb" 
| 134 || August 30 || @ Yankees || 8–7 || Wilson (2–4) || Betances (4–4) || Greene (28) || 37,195 || 54–80 || W1
|- bgcolor="ffbbbb"
| 135 || August 31 || @ Yankees || 5–7 || Britton (2–0) || Jiménez (4–4) || Robertson (5) || 41,026 || 54–81 || L1 
|-

|- bgcolor="ffbbbb"
| 136 || September 1 || @ Yankees || 1–2 || Tanaka (10–5) || Norris (0–3) || Betances (2) || 42,816 || 54–82 || L2
|- bgcolor="bbffbb" 
| 137 || September 2 || @ Yankees || 11–7 || Boyd (9–12) || Lynn (8–10) || — || 43,721 || 55–82 || W1
|- bgcolor="ffbbbb"
| 138 || September 3 || @ White Sox || 2–4 || Fry (2–2) || Greene (2–6) || — || 15,540 || 55–83 || L1 
|- bgcolor="bbffbb" 
| 139 || September 4 || @ White Sox || 8–3 || Liriano (4–9) || Giolito (10–10) || — || 13,012 || 56–83 || W1
|- bgcolor="bbffbb" 
| 140 || September 5 || @ White Sox || 10–2 || Zimmermann (7–6) || Kopech (1–1) || — || 16,036 || 57–83 || W2
|- bgcolor="bbffbb" 
| 141 || September 7 || Cardinals || 5–3 || Greene (3–6) || Hicks (3–4) || — || 21,268 || 58–83 || W3
|- bgcolor="bbffbb"
| 142 || September 8 || Cardinals || 4–3 || Greene (4–6) || Norris (3–5) || — || 30,268 || 59–83 || W4
|- bgcolor="ffbbbb"
| 143 || September 9 || Cardinals || 2–5 || Gant (7–5) || Fulmer (3–11) || Martínez (2) || 22,212 || 59–84 || L1
|- bgcolor="ffbbbb"
| 144 || September 10 || Astros || 2–3 || Verlander (15–9) || Liriano (4–10) || Osuna (16) || 19,711 || 59–85 || L2
|- bgcolor="ffbbbb"
| 145 || September 11 || Astros || 4–5 || Harris (4–3) || Zimmermann (7–7) || Osuna (17) || 19,432 || 59–86 || L3
|- bgcolor="ffbbbb"
| 146 || September 12 || Astros || 4–5 || Cole (14–5) || Norris (0–4) || Pressly (1) || 22,666 || 59–87 || L4
|- bgcolor="bbffbb"
| 147 || September 14 || @ Indians || 5–4 || VerHagen (3–2) || Cimber (3–7) || Greene (29) || 26,952 || 60–87 || W1
|- bgcolor="ffbbbb"
| 148 || September 15 || @ Indians || 0–15 || Clevinger (12–8) || Fulmer (3–12) || — || 26,532 || 60–88 || L1
|- bgcolor="bbffbb"
| 149 || September 16 || @ Indians || 6–4 || Liriano (5–10) || Bieber (10–4) || Greene (30) || 24,862 || 61–88 || W1
|- bgcolor="ffbbbb"
| 150 || September 17 || Twins || 1–6 || Stewart (2–1) || Zimmermann (7–8) || — || 19,004 || 61–89 || L1
|- bgcolor="ffbbbb"
| 151 || September 18 || Twins || 3–5 || Odorizzi (7–10) || Norris (0–5) || Hildenberger (7) || 19,740 || 61–90 || L2
|- bgcolor="ffbbbb"
| 152 || September 19 || Twins || 2–8 || Gonsalves (1–2) || Turnbull (0–1) || — || 19,296 || 61–91 || L3 
|- bgcolor="bbffbb"
| 153 || September 20 || Royals || 11–8 || Reininger (1–0) || López (2–4) || — || 20,282 || 62–91 || W1
|- bgcolor="ffbbbb"
| 154 || September 21 || Royals || 3–4 || Kennedy (3–8) || Liriano (5–11) || Peralta (12) || 22,001 || 62–92 || L1
|- bgcolor="bbffbb"
| 155 || September 22 || Royals || 5–4 || Jiménez (5–4) || Hammel (3–14) || Greene (31) || 24,815 || 63–92 || W1
|- bgcolor="ffbbbb"
| 156 || September 23 || Royals || 2–3 || Keller (9–6) || VerHagen (3–3) || Peralta (13) || 24,230 || 63–93 || L1
|- bgcolor="bbffbb"
| 157 || September 25 || @ Twins || 4–2 || Alcántara (1–0) || Hildenberger (4–6) || Greene (32) || 23,849 || 64–93 || W1
|- bgcolor="ffbbbb"
| 158 || September 26 || @ Twins || 4–11 || Duffey (2–2) || Boyd (9–13) || — || 21,316 || 64–94 || L1
|- bgcolor="ffbbbb"
| 159 || September 27 || @ Twins || 3–9 || Gonsalves (2–2) || Liriano (5–12) || — || 22,342 || 64–95 || L2
|- bgcolor="ffbbbb"
| 160 || September 28 || @ Brewers || 5–6 || Soria (2–1) || Alcántara (1–1) || Jeffress (14) || 44,770 || 64–96 || L3
|- bgcolor="ffbbbb"
| 161 || September 29 || @ Brewers || 5–6 || Soria (3–1) || Stumpf (1–5) || Jeffress (15) || 45,520 || 64–97 || L4
|- bgcolor="ffbbbb"
| 162 || September 30 || @ Brewers || 0–11 || González (10–11) || Turnbull (0–2) || — || 41,848 || 64–98 || L5
|-

|- style="text-align:center;"
| Legend:       = Win       = Loss       = PostponementBold = Tigers team member

Roster

Farm system

References

External links

2018 Detroit Tigers Roster and Schedule at Baseball Almanac
2018 Detroit Tigers Statistics at Baseball Reference
Detroit Tigers 2018 Schedule and Stats at MLB.com

Detroit Tigers seasons
Detroit Tigers
Detroit Tigers
2018 in Detroit